Arliss is a cable television series that aired on HBO.

Series overview

Episodes

Season 1 (1996)

Season 2 (1997)

Season 3 (1998)

Season 4 (1999)

Season 5 (2000)

Season 6 (2001)

Season 7 (2002)

References

External links

Lists of American sitcom episodes